Dingana alticola, the red-banded widow, is a butterfly of the family Nymphalidae. It is only known from high altitude grassland in the Steenkampsberg area in the Mpumalanga province.

The wingspan is 57–64 mm for males and 56–61 mm for females. Adults are on wing from September to November (with a peak in October). There is one generation per year

The larvae probably feed on various Poaceae species.

References

Satyrini
Butterflies described in 1996